The women's doubles of the 2009 ECM Prague Open tournament was played on clay in Prague, Czech Republic.

Andrea Hlaváčková and Lucie Hradecká was the defending champions, but lost in the semifinal with Iveta Benešová and Barbora Záhlavová-Strýcová.

Alyona Bondarenko and Kateryna Bondarenko won in the final 6–1, 6–2, against Iveta Benešová and Barbora Záhlavová-Strýcová.

Seeds

Draw

Draw

External links
Draw

ECM Prague Open - Doubles
2009 - Doubles